The BMW Track Trainer is a modified BMW 330i that can negotiate a race track autonomously at the limit of traction. It was conceived as a driver training tool that allows a new student to experience the ideal race line from the driver's seat. The vehicle is a research project from BMW Group Research and Technology (BMW Forschung und Technik GmbH).

Race tracks 

Track Trainer has raced autonomously at Valencia, Hockenheimring, Lausitzring, Zandvoort, Nordschleife, and Mazda Raceway Laguna Seca.

Media coverage 

Track Trainer was covered by Top Gear in a segment during the 2007 season and The Car Show on the third episode of the 2011 season.

Technology 

Track Trainer uses a combination of GPS and INS data to create a precision position estimate of the vehicle states in real-time. Vehicle control is commanded to an ideal line recorded by a manually driven reference lap.

References 

Track Trainer